Gordon Richard Oliver (born 25 May 1939) is a minister emeritus of the Unitarian Church in Cape Town, a former politician and Mayor of Cape Town, South Africa.

Biography
Oliver was born in Bloemfontein and raised in Gardens, Cape Town. He attended a Catholic boarding school and after school started a job as a clerk for Old Mutual in Pinelands. He had several jobs in human resources and started managing an environmental education NGO.

From a young age, he worked as a volunteer for the Progressive Party and later the Progressive Federal Party. Oliver became a part time city councillor in the Cape Town municipality during 1976 and was elected deputy mayor in 1987. At the time, the mayor and deputy mayor offices were ceremonial, with no executive powers and both offices were only for a two-year period. 

Oliver became mayor on 8 September 1989. Five days after his inauguration as mayor, Oliver along with religious leaders such as Desmond Tutu, Frank Chikane, Farid Esack and Allan Boesak, led a peace march in Cape Town in defiance of the State of Emergency which banned political protests and apartheid laws which enforced racial segregation. That protest march was the first of the two major highlights of Oliver’s mayoral term. The second was welcoming Nelson Mandela to the Cape Town City Hall to address the South African nation and the world on 11 February 1990, the day of his release from prison.

After completing his two years as mayor, Oliver worked as head of Cape Town Tourism (Captour) for about eight years. He left Captour in 1998 and was offered a position to organise an international conference for the Parliament of World Religions, which took place in 1999.

When the Cape Town's Unitarian minister died in 1997, Oliver became the congregation's unofficial minister as a volunteer, and in 2000 the church hired him as minister in training. He studied in England and at the University of South Africa and was officially recognized as a minister in 2002 by the British General Assembly. He worked in the Cape Town ministry until 2008 and also obtained a master's degree in religious studies.

References

Living people
1939 births
Mayors of Cape Town